Presidential elections were held in Syria on 8 February 1978. There was only one candidate, Hafez al-Assad, with voters asked to approve or reject his candidacy. A reported 99.9% of voters voted in favour, with a turnout of 97%.

Results

References

Syria
1978 in Syria
Presidential elections in Syria
Single-candidate elections